Bepoase may refer to:

 Bepoase (Ashanti Region), Ghana
 Bepoase (Eastern Region), Ghana